Artvin District (also: Merkez, meaning "central") is a district of Artvin Province of Turkey. Its seat is the town Artvin. Its area is 1,141 km2, and its population is 34,537 (2021).

Composition
There is one municipality in Artvin District:
 Artvin

There are 36 villages in Artvin District:

 Ağıllar
 Ahlat
 Alabalık
 Aşağımaden
 Bağcılar
 Bakırköy
 Ballıüzüm
 Beşağıl
 Çimenli
 Derinköy
 Dikmenli
 Dokuzoğul
 Erenler
 Fıstıklı
 Hamamlı
 Hızarlı
 Kalburlu
 Köseler
 Okumuşlar
 Ormanlı
 Ortaköy
 Oruçlu
 Pırnallı
 Sakalar
 Salkımlı
 Sarıbudak
 Seyitler
 Sümbüllü
 Şehitlik
 Taşlıca
 Tütüncüler
 Varlık
 Vezirköy
 Yanıklı
 Yukarımaden
 Zeytinlik

References

Districts of Artvin Province